Brandon Brown may refer to:

Brandon Brown (basketball, born 1985), American basketball player
Brandon Brown (basketball, born 1989), American basketball player
Brandon Brown (basketball, born 1991), American basketball player
Brandon Brown (racing driver) (born 1993), American racing driver
Brandon Brown (rugby union) (born 1994), South African rugby union player
Brandon Brown, member of R&B band Mista
Murder of Brandon Brown (1986–2012), American college football player killed after a game